Straight Up is the debut album by tenor saxophonist Eric Alexander. It was recorded in 1992 and released by Delmark Records.

Recording and music
The album was recorded at Riverside Studio, Chicago, on August 21–22, 1992. The five musicians are tenor saxophonist Eric Alexander, trumpeter Jim Rotondi, pianist Harold Mabern, bassist John Webber, and drummer George Fludas.

Release and reception

Straight Up was released by Delmark Records. It was Alexander's first album as leader. The AllMusic reviewer wrote that Alexander "has a full, bright, impressive tone, excellent facility and command of the instrument and is steadily developing a personal sound. While the tracks vary in quality, most are at worst competent and at best outstanding."

Track listing
"Straight Up" (Eric Alexander) – 8:24 	
"What Are You Doing the Rest of Your Life?" (Alan Bergman, Marilyn Bergman, Michel Legrand) – 8:25 	
"Be My Love" (Nicholas Brodszky, Sammy Cahn) – 7:49 	
"Blues Waltz" (Ray Charles) – 8:05 	
"Laura" (Johnny Mercer, David Raksin) – 8:02 	
"An Oscar for Treadwell" (Charlie Parker) – 7:21 	
"The End of a Love Affair" (Edward Redding) – 8:08 	
"Love Is a Many Splendored Thing" (Sammy Fain, Paul Francis Webster) – 7:57

Personnel
Eric Alexander – tenor saxophone
Jim Rotondi – trumpet
Harold Mabern – piano
John Webber – bass
George Fludas – drums

References

1992 albums
Delmark Records albums
Eric Alexander (jazz saxophonist) albums